Mount Nimrod (officially Mount Nimrod/Kaumira since 2010) is a hill in the Hunters Hills area of Canterbury, New Zealand. It is situated within the Mount Nimrod Reserve.

References

Hills of New Zealand